Paralympic swimming at the 2018 Asian Para Games was held from 7 to 12 October 2018 at the Gelora Bung Karno Aquatic Stadium.

Medal summary

Medal table

Men's events

Women's events

Mixed events

Non-medal events

 Men's 100m Backstroke S1-2
 Women's 100m Backstroke S1-2
 Women's 50m Backstroke S5
 Men's 150m Individual Medley SM4 (1-4)
 Women's 50m Freestyle S10
 Women's 150m Individual Medley SM4 (1-4)
 Mixed 4X100m Freestyle Relay 49 Points
 Women's 50m Breaststroke SB3 (1-3)
 Women's 100m Backstroke S10
 Mixed 4X100m Freestyle Relay S14

See also 
 Swimming at the 2017 ASEAN Para Games
 Swimming at the 2018 Asian Games

References

External links 
 Para Swimming - Asian Para Games 2018
 RESULT SYSTEM - ASIAN PARA GAMES JAKARTA 2018

2018 Asian Para Games events